Henry Gage, 3rd Viscount Gage (4 March 1761 – 29 January 1808) was a British Army officer, Member of Parliament and peer.

Henry Gage was born in Montreal, the eldest son of General Thomas Gage, military leader of British Forces at the beginning of the American Revolution, and Margaret Kemble. He was educated at Westminster School.

He joined the British Army and was made a lieutenant in the 7th Foot (Royal Fusiliers) in 1777, captain in the 26th Foot in 1779, and major in the 93rd Foot in 1783. He was subsequently promoted to brevet lieutenant-colonel in 1794, colonel in 1798 and major-general in 1805.

He was also a captain in the Sussex yeomanry (1798), a lt.-colonel in 1798 and Colonel of the South Pevensey Volunteers in 1803. He was made Lieutenant-Colonel-Commandant in 1804.

He was elected Member of Parliament for Warwick from 1790 and sat until 11 October 1791, when he inherited the title Viscount Gage in the Peerage of Ireland and Baron Gage in the Peerage of Great Britain from his uncle, William Gage and was called to the House of Lords.

In 1789 he married his cousin, Susanna Maria Skinner, a descendant of the Delancey family. Both Henry and his wife shared extensive Dutch roots in British North America, including the Schuyler family and Van Cortlandt family, among others. Through his wife, Gage inherited a large part of the American estate of Vice-Admiral Sir Peter Warren (Warren was Susanna's grandfather). The historic letters and documents from this inheritance were later donated to the Sussex Archaeological Society of Lewes. They had two sons.

He died in 1808 and was succeeded by Henry Hall Gage, 4th Viscount Gage.

See also

 Viscount Gage

References

1761 births
1808 deaths
Pre-Confederation Quebec people
People educated at Westminster School, London
British Army major generals
Viscounts Gage
Members of the Parliament of Great Britain for English constituencies
British MPs 1790–1796
English people of Dutch descent
Henry
Schuyler family
van Cortlandt family
18th-century British Army personnel
19th-century British Army personnel